Charles Noel Brown (June 21, 1933 – July 24, 1962) and Charles Edwin Kelley (February 17, 1941 – September 6, 1962) were American spree killers who killed three people and wounded three others in a five-day, three-state rampage in February 1961. The duo, who said they shot the victims to avoid leaving witnesses, were labeled the "Mad Dog Killers". Sentenced to death for a murder committed in Iowa, Brown and Kelley became the second-to-last and last people executed in the state, respectively. Iowa abolished capital punishment in 1965.

Early lives 
According to Brown's mother, sister, and uncle, he had a rough life and dropped out of school after 8th grade to help his family. His father was a frequently absent alcoholic.

In 1956, Kelley was diagnosed with epilepsy after becoming dizzy and falling down. During his murder trial, he testified that he stopped taking medication after about a year. When he was 17, Kelley volunteered for the Marines with his father's permission, but was discharged 17 days later after suffering from a gran mal seizure.

Murders 
Brown, an ex-con who had served prison time for forgery, met Kelley as they were working together as parking lot attendants. The two soon became drinking buddies. After Kelley robbed a gas station armed with a screwdriver, Brown used the money to buy two handguns.

On February 18, 1961, Brown and Kelley robbed a gas station in Minnesota. They shot the attendant, 17-year-old James Peterson, three times. Two of the shots hit Peterson in the head, and the third likely would've hit him in the heart, but was deflected by a button on his work uniform. Peterson went into a coma, emerged from it a few days later long enough to talk to police, and then went into unconsciousness once more. He would remain in critical condition for more than a month, but survived. Peterson died from complications from his injuries in 2007.

On February 20, Brown and Kelley shot and killed 52-year-old Howard Trowbridge while robbing his tavern in Minneapolis, Minnesota. They also shot the bartender, 30-year-old George Koch, six times. He survived his injuries. They then took a bus to Nebraska.

The next day, the duo killed 60-year-old Harry Goldberg during a liquor store robbery in Omaha. Brown later said "I took this old man into the rear room, and I told him to turn around. He didn't do as I asked, so I shot him with my gun."

The two then took a taxi to Council Bluffs, Iowa, where they planned to steal a car and make their getaway. Brown and Kelley carjacked 54-year-old Alvin Koerhsen and ordered him to drive at gunpoint. After driving several blocks, they had him pull over. The two then shot Koerhsen seven times and dumped him onto the street. He died from his injuries two days later. After failing to turn the car back on, the two were forced to move on foot. About 20 minutes later, they went to a parking lot, where they saw Kenneth Vencel was getting into his car. When they threatened him, he ran away. Brown and Kelley shot Vencel three times, once in the stomach and twice in the back. He survived his injuries. The two then drove north. However, they only drove about 25 miles before the car broke down in Missouri Valley.

Kelley and Brown took a bus en route to Kansas City, Missouri. However, they drew the suspicion of a ticket manager in Iowa, who contacted the police. The two were promptly arrested in Council Bluffs.

Trials and executions 
Kelley and Brown were charged with first degree murder and armed robbery for killing Koerhsen in Iowa. Prosecutors announced they would seek a death sentence for both of them.

Brown was tried first. He made no attempt to contest his guilt and was quickly found guilty. Several of his family members testified during the sentencing phase. On the stand, Brown said he had a drinking problem, had started drinking when he was around 10 or 11, and was drinking heavily during his crime spree.

During their deliberations, the jury asked the judge if Brown would have a chance of parole if he was given a life sentence, and how many years he would have to serve in prison if that was the case (all life sentences are without parole in Iowa, and a lifer's only chance of freedom is if the governor commutes their sentence to make them eligible for release). The judge said "You have a right to assume any verdict returned by you will be faithfully carried out. Should you desire to make any recommendations after you have agreed upon your verdict you may write them on paper and return it with your verdict." Hearing this, Brown's uncle, Paul Day, became hopeful that his nephew might be spared execution. However, less than two hours later, after nearly 14 hours of deliberation, the jury came out with a recommendation for a death sentence. In response, Brown said "I knew this was coming. I don't care. The only thing I feel bad about is my folks."

Kelley's lawyers initially planned for an insanity defense, but that was thrown out. He was convicted of both charges. Kelley presented a much stronger defense than Brown during the sentencing phase, with his defense emphasizing his epilepsy. A psychiatrist who examined Kelley said he had a "sociopathic personality", and found no evidence of a "psychotic reaction which would indicate that Mr. Kelley is not responsible for his acts." Another mitigating factor mentioned was Kelley's youth. At the age of 20, he would be one of the youngest people executed in Iowa.

After deliberating for 48 hours, the jury deadlocked, resulting in a mistrial and leaving Kelley’s fate up to Judge Leroy H. Johnson. The jury foreman, Sam Garnett, said all of the jurors knew Kelley was guilty, but that he and another juror wanted a life sentence. "I couldn't ask for hanging when there were small doubts in my mind whether the killing was premeditated, whether Kelley altogether was a mentally sound person, and how much influence the older man (Brown) had on him.”

Hoping for leniency, Kelley pleaded guilty rather than face a retrial. At his sentencing hearing, his attorney, Robert C. Heithoff, presented additional evidence of his client possibly having a history of epilepsy. He told Johnson that "the easy thing and perhaps the popular thing is to hang Kelley. Many people would applaud you. Some would rejoice. But later, after consideration and thought, people would not gain in any acclaim of death. All life is worth saving, and mercy is the highest attitude of man."

Johnson announced that he would need two weeks to reach his decision, which was considered an usually long amount of time. On June 7, 1961, Johnson sentenced Kelley to death.

After their appeals failed and governor Norman A. Erbe declined to intervene, Brown and Kelley were both executed at the Iowa State Penitentiary in Fort Madison. Brown was hanged on July 24, 1962, becoming the first man executed in Iowa since 1952. As he walked to the gallows, he said he hoped that "the people will forgive me for what I've done." Brown's last words immediately before dropping through the trapdoor were "God forgive me." He was pronounced dead at 5:05 a.m. CST. Kelley was hanged on September 6, 1962. His last words were "I'm sorry what I did." Kelley was pronounced dead at 5:46 a.m. CST. His last request was for the prison chaplain, Lester Peter, to read the 23rd Psalm. At 21, Kelley became both the second youngest and last person to be executed in Iowa. Among the witnesses to his executions was Vencel, who still had a bullet lodged near his spine. "I'm pretty happy to be here today," he said. "He's got it coming to him. At least they got a trial. The other fellows shot by Kelley and Brown didn't get one." 

Another man, Victor Feguer, was executed in 1963, but he was hanged for a federal conviction. 

In 1965, the Iowa General Assembly passed a law that abolished the death penalty as a possible punishment; it was signed into law by Governor Harold Hughes. Although there have been a number of attempts to reinstate the death penalty in Iowa, none have been successful. Since Kelley’s executions, prisoners of the United States federal government have been executed in Iowa but no one has been executed under Iowa law.

See also
 Capital punishment in Iowa
 Capital punishment in the United States
 List of most recent executions by jurisdiction
 List of people executed in Iowa

References

1933 births
1941 births
1962 deaths
20th-century executions by Iowa
American people convicted of murder
20th-century executions of American people
History of Iowa
People executed by Iowa by hanging
American people executed for murder
People convicted of murder by Iowa
Executed spree killers
American spree killers
Criminal duos